George Berci (born 14 March 1921) is a Hungarian surgeon at Cedars-Sinai Medical Center in Los Angeles, United States and a pioneer in minimally invasive surgeries. He developed instruments for laparoscopic surgery that have been incorporated into minimally invasive surgery techniques used today. Berci turned 100 in March 2021.

Background 
Berci was born in Szeged, Hungary, in 1921 and spent time in both Hungary and Austria as a boy. He became a conscripted laborer for the Hungarians in 1942 but escaped in 1944 on a train near Budapest. He made his way to Budapest and worked for the Hungarian underground until World War II ended. He lost his father and grandfather in the war, but his mother survived. Berci wanted to become a musician, but his mother insisted that he become a doctor. He graduated from medical school at the University of Szeged in 1950 and took a position as a surgeon at the University Hospital in Budapest.

Career 
In 1956, when the Hungarian Revolution took place, Dr. Berci was one of six doctors awarded a two-year Rockefeller Fellowship and he went to Melbourne, Australia. In 1962, he developed the first miniature camera to use with an endoscope, which contributed to the development of video endoscopy. In the early 1960s, he performed some of the first fluoroscopic cholangiograms in the world. He was recruited in 1967 to move to Los Angeles and join Cedar-Sinai as a visiting scholar in the Department of Surgery. Three years into his time at Cedars Sinai, he became the director of the multidisciplinary surgical endoscopy unit. In 1989, with John Hunter, MD, he started national surgical training courses to ensure that surgeons were performing the techniques correctly.

He served as the president of the Society of American Gastrointestinal and Endoscopic Surgeons in 1992.

In 2012, Berci opened the George Berci Surgical Training and Research Laboratory of Department of Surgical Research and Techniques in Budapest, Hungary.

He published more than 200 research papers and published textbooks and chapters on endoscopic surgery.

Recognition 
Berci received the Jacobson Innovation Award from the American College of Surgeons in 2011 in recognition of the endoscopic and laparoscopic techniques that he refined. In 2012, a film was created by SAGES and the SAGES Foundation about his life called "George Berci: Trials, Triumphs, Innovations". The Society of Gastrointestinal and Endoscopic Surgeons created the George Berci Lifetime Achievement Award in Endoscopic Surgery in his honor. In 2012, he was awarded an honorary doctorate from Semmelweis University.

References 

1921 births
Living people
Hungarian surgeons
University of Szeged alumni
Rockefeller Fellows
People from Szeged
20th-century American Jews
American centenarians
Hungarian centenarians
Men centenarians
Hungarian emigrants to the United States
21st-century American Jews